Jan Stachura (born 24 September 1948) is a Polish former racing cyclist. He won the Tour de Pologne 1970.

References

External links

1948 births
Living people
Polish male cyclists
Place of birth missing (living people)